Scythris elachistoides is a moth of the family Scythrididae. It was described by Bengt Å. Bengtsson in 2002. It is found in the United Arab Emirates, Yemen and Oman.

The wingspan is 6–7.5 mm. The forewings are mottled by whitish and fuscous scales and some markings may be observed in most specimens. There is a dark fascia at one-third and a transverse dash near the base. The hindwings are narrow, pale fuscous, and darker at the tip.

Etymology
The species name refers to its resemblance to Elachistidae species.

References

elachistoides
Moths described in 2002